Jerman School is a historic school building located at Greensburg, Decatur County, Indiana. It was built in 1914, and is a two-story, Tudor Revival style steel frame building on a raised foundation. It is sheathed in brick with limestone trim and consists of two projecting end bays, two classroom wings, and the central entrance bay.  The building was renovated in 2003 to house senior apartments.

It was added to the National Register of Historic Places in 2005.

References

External links

School buildings on the National Register of Historic Places in Indiana
Tudor Revival architecture in Indiana
School buildings completed in 1914
Buildings and structures in Decatur County, Indiana
National Register of Historic Places in Decatur County, Indiana
1914 establishments in Indiana